The 1984–85 season of the European Cup club football tournament was overshadowed by the Heysel Stadium disaster that happened prior to the final match. That edition was won for the first time by Juventus in a 1–0 win against defending champions Liverpool. At sporting level, with this result they became the first club to have won all three major European trophies (European Cup/UEFA Champions League, UEFA Cup/UEFA Europa League, and the Cup Winners' Cup), as well a posteriori as the one that needed the shortest amount of time to complete this (8 years).

Following the disaster, English clubs received a five-year ban from entering any European competition, thus ending a period of great success for English clubs in the European Cup which had seen three clubs winning seven finals since 1977, including six successive finals up to 1982. Liverpool, English champions in 1989–90, were given an extra year's ban. There would be no English club to win the trophy until 1999, when Manchester United beat Bayern Munich 2–1.

Bracket

First round

|}

First leg

Second leg

Grasshopper won 4–3 on aggregate.

Austria Wien won 8–0 on aggregate.

1–1 on aggregate; Linfield won on away goals.

Sparta Praha won 5–3 on aggregate.

3–3 on aggregate; BFC Dynamo won 5–4 on penalties.

Dnipro Dnipropetrovsk won 3–1 on aggregate.

Lyngby won 6–0 on aggregate.

IFK Göteborg won 17–0 on aggregate.

Dinamo Bucharest won 5–3 on aggregate.

3–3 on aggregate; Levski-Spartak won on away goals.

Beveren won 7–2 on aggregate.

Panathinaikos won 2–1 on aggregate.

Juventus won 6–1 on aggregate.

Bordeaux won 3–2 on aggregate.

Liverpool won 5–0 on aggregate.

Benfica won 4–3 on aggregate.

Second round

|}

First leg

Second leg

3–3 on aggregate; Dnipro Dnipropetrovsk won on away goals.

Bordeaux won 2–1 on aggregate.

Sparta Praha won 2–1 on aggregate.

Austria Wien won 5–4 on aggregate.

Juventus won 6–2 on aggregate.

2–2 on aggregate; IFK Göteborg won on away goals.

Panathinaikos won 5–4 on aggregate.

Liverpool won 3–2 on aggregate.

Quarter-finals

|}

First leg

Second leg

Juventus won 3–1 on aggregate.

2–2 on aggregate; Bordeaux won 5–3 on penalties.

Panathinaikos won 3–2 on aggregate.

Liverpool won 5–2 on aggregate.

Semi-finals

|}

First leg

Second leg

Juventus won 3–2 on aggregate.

Liverpool won 5–0 on aggregate.

Final

Top scorers

Notes

References

External links
1984–85 All matches – season at UEFA website
 European Cup results at Rec.Sport.Soccer Statistics Foundation
 All scorers 1984–85 European Cup according to protocols UEFA
1984–85 European Cup – results and line-ups (archive)

1984–85 European Cup
1984–85 in European football
European Champion Clubs' Cup seasons